Loyola High School, Hindupur is a private Catholic primary and secondary school located in Hindupur, Andhra Pradesh, India. The school was established by the Society of Jesus in 1990 and caters mainly to the Dalits.

History 
Loyola School in the English medium opened in 2008, with the English high school functioning after 2012.

See also

 List of Jesuit schools

References  

Jesuit secondary schools in India
Schools in Anantapur district
Christian schools in Andhra Pradesh
Educational institutions established in 1990
1990 establishments in Andhra Pradesh
Jesuit primary schools in India
High schools and secondary schools in Andhra Pradesh
Elementary and primary schools in Andhra Pradesh